Jason Washburn (born June 5, 1990) is an American professional basketball player who currently plays for the Taoyuan Pilots of the P. League+. He played college basketball for the University of Utah.

High school career
Washburn attended his hometown's Battle Creek Central High School, leading the team to the district championship and regional finals as a senior and district championships as a junior. As a junior, he averaged 17 points, eight rebounds and five blocked shots per game while averaging a double-double as a senior, with at least two triple-doubles (points, rebounds, blocks). He became the all-time blocks leader at BCC and set a new school record for blocks in a season and blocks in a game.

College career
As a four-year player at Utah, Washburn appeared in 123 games with 70 starts and averaged 8.7 points, 5.0 rebounds and 1.3 blocks in 22.4 minutes per game, finishing as the Utes' leading scorer (11.4 ppg), rebounder (6.2 rpg) and shot blocker (1.4 bpg) as a junior in 2011–12.

Professional career
On June 12, 2013, Washburn signed with Cherkaski Mavpy of the Ukrainian Basketball SuperLeague for the 2013–14 season. After averaging 14.1 points and 6.3 rebounds per game, he left Cherkaski on February 27, 2014. Four days later, he signed a one-month deal with Tsmoki-Minsk of the Belarusian Premier League.

On May 20, 2014, Washburn signed with Basic-Fit Brussels of the Belgian Ethias League, and that offseason, he joined the Utah Jazz for the 2014 Las Vegas Summer League. During the 2014–15 season, he played 27 games with the Belgian outfit, starting six and posting averages of 8.9 points, 3.9 rebounds and 0.8 blocks in 18.7 minutes per game.

On September 15, 2015, Washburn signed with the Charlotte Hornets. However, he was waived on October 23 after appearing in four preseason games. On November 3, he signed with Sigal Prishtina of the Kosovo Basketball Superleague.

In August 2016 Washburn signed with the Yokohama B-Corsairs for the inaugural season of the Japanese B.League. He was injured most of the 2017–18 season and missed most of the year. On August 21, 2018, Washburn signed with the Romanian club U BT Cluj-Napoca.

Washburn signed with the Niigata Albirex BB on November 5, 2020.

On August 9, 2022, Washburn signed with the Taoyuan Pilots of the P. LEAGUE+.

Personal life
Washburn is the son of Bob Washburn and Dawn Lewis and majored in Mass Communication.

Career statistics 

|-
| align="left" | 2016-17
| align="left" |Yokohama
|51  ||37 ||26.5 ||.576  ||.500  ||.742  ||7.1  ||1.2  ||0.6  ||0.7  || 1.9 || 14.8
|-
| align="left" | 2017-18
| align="left" | Yokohama
|4 ||4  ||21.5 ||.621 ||- ||.706 ||5.8 ||1.0 ||0.2 ||0.8 ||2.5 ||12.0
|-
| align="left" |  2019-20
| align="left" | Yokohama
| ||  || || || || || || || || || ||

References

External links
Utah bio
RealGM profile
USBasket profile
DraftExpress profile

1990 births
Living people
American expatriate basketball people in Belarus
American expatriate basketball people in Belgium
American expatriate basketball people in Japan
American expatriate basketball people in Kosovo
American expatriate basketball people in Romania
American expatriate basketball people in Ukraine
American men's basketball players
Basketball players from Michigan
BC Cherkaski Mavpy players
BC Tsmoki-Minsk players
Brussels Basketball players
Centers (basketball)
CS Universitatea Cluj-Napoca (men's basketball) players
Niigata Albirex BB players
KB Prishtina players
Sportspeople from Battle Creek, Michigan
Utah Utes men's basketball players
Yokohama B-Corsairs players
Taoyuan Pilots players
P. League+ imports